The 2014 New Mexico gubernatorial election took place on November 4, 2014, to elect the Governor of New Mexico. Incumbent Republican Governor Susana Martínez successfully ran for re-election to a second term in office, defeating Democratic Attorney General Gary King, son of former governor Bruce King.

Unlike in most states, New Mexico's governor and lieutenant governor are elected in separate primaries. The winning candidates then run together on the same ticket. Primary elections were held on June 3, 2014.

Republican primary

Candidates

Declared
 Susana Martínez, incumbent Governor

Declined
 Gary Johnson, former Governor of New Mexico, businessman and Libertarian Party nominee for president in 2012

Endorsements

Results

Democratic primary

Candidates

Declared
 Gary King, Attorney General of New Mexico, candidate for governor in 1998 and 2002, nominee for NM-02 in 2004, and son of former Governor Bruce King
 Linda M. Lopez, state senator
 Howie Morales, state senator
 Lawrence Rael, former State Executive Director of the Farm Service Agency, former CAO of Albuquerque and candidate for lieutenant governor in 2010
 Alan Webber, businessman

Declined
 Hector Balderas, state auditor of New Mexico and candidate for the U.S. Senate in 2012 (running for Attorney General)
 Jeff Bingaman, former U.S. Senator
 Joseph Cervantes, state senator
 Tim Keller, state senator (running for state auditor)
 Antonio Maestas, state representative
 Michael S. Sanchez, Majority Leader of the New Mexico Senate

Polling

Endorsements

Results

General election

Candidates
 Susana Martínez (Republican), incumbent Governor of New Mexico.
 Gary King (Democratic), Attorney General of New Mexico.

Predictions

Polling

 * Internal poll for Susana Martínez campaign
 ^ Internal poll for Gary King campaign

Results

References

External links
 New Mexico gubernatorial election, 2014 at Ballotpedia

Official campaign websites (Archived)
 Susana Martínez incumbent
 Gary King
 Linda Lopez
 Lawerence Rael
 Howie Morales
 Alan Webber

gubernatorial
2014
2014 United States gubernatorial elections